Nels is a given name. Notable people with the given name include:

Nels Anderson (1889–1986), American sociologist
Nels Andrews, American folk singer
Nels Cline (born 1956), American guitarist and composer
Nels Crutchfield (1911–1985), Canadian ice hockey player
Nels F. S. Ferré (1908-1971), Swedish-born American theologian
Nels Holman (1861–1946), American newspaper editor, businessman, and politician
Nels Jacobson (born 1949), American artist and poster art historian
Nels Jensen (born 1981), American record producer, recording engineer, and mixing engineer
Nels Johnson (1838-1915), Danish-born American clockmaker
Nels C. Nelson (1875–1964), Danish-American archaeologist
Nels Nelson (politician) (1917–1992), Canadian politician
Nels Nelsen (1894–1943), Norwegian–Canadian ski jumper
Nels David Nelson (1918–2003), American mathematician and logician
Nels S.D. Peterson (born 1978), American lawyer and jurist
Nels Pierson (born 1972), American politician
Nels Podolsky (1923–2007), Canadian ice hockey player
Nels Potter (1911–1990), American baseball player
Nels Running (born 1941), retired United States Air Force Major General
Nels H. Smith (1884–1976), American politician
Nels J. Smith (born 1939), American politician
Nels Stewart (1902–1957), Canadian ice hockey player
Nels Swandal, American politician
Nels Wold (1895–1918), United States Army soldier